Gwyneth Jones (born 14 February 1952) is an English science fiction and fantasy writer and critic, and a young adult/children's writer under the pen name Ann Halam.

Biography and writing career
Jones was born in Manchester, England. Education at a convent school was followed by an undergraduate degree in European history of ideas at the University of Sussex. She has written for younger readers since 1980 under the pseudonym Ann Halam and, under that name, has published more than twenty novels. In 1984 Divine Endurance, a science fiction novel for adults, was published under her own name and in which she created the term gynoid. She continues to write using these two names for the respective audiences.

Jones' works are mostly science fiction and near future high fantasy with strong themes of gender and feminism. She is the winner of two World Fantasy Awards, BSFA short story award, Children of the Night Award from the Dracula Society, the Arthur C. Clarke Award, the Philip K. Dick Award and co-winner of the James Tiptree Jr. Award. She is generally well-reviewed critically and, as a feminist science fiction writer, is often compared to Ursula K. Le Guin, though the two authors are very much distinct in both content and style of work.

Gwyneth Jones lives in Brighton, England, with her husband and son.

Bibliography

Novels

Fiction collections
Identifying the Object. Austin: Swan Press, 1993 (paper). No ISBN
Seven Tales and a Fable. Cambridge: Edgewood Press, 1995 (paper). 
Grazing the Long Acre. Hornsea: PS Publishing, 2009. 
The Buonarotti Quartet. Seattle: Aqueduct Press, 2009 (paper).
The Universe of Things. Seattle: Aqueduct Press, 2011 (trade paper).

Short stories
 "Red Sonja and Lessingham in Dreamland" (1996) in Off Limits: Tales of Alien Sex (anthology) and (2007) in Rewired: The Post-Cyberpunk Anthology (anthology)
 "Saving Tiamaat" (2007) in The New Space Opera (anthology)
 "The Ki-anna" (2010) in Engineering Infinity (anthology)
"A Planet Called Desire" (2015) in Old Venus (anthology)

Non-fiction
Deconstructing the Starships: Science, Fiction and Reality. Liverpool: Liverpool University Press, 1999. 
Imagination / Space. Seattle, WA: Aqueduct Press, 2009 (paper).
 Joanna Russ. Urbana, IL: University of Illinois Press, 2019.

As Ann Halam
 Ally, Ally, Aster. London: Allen & Unwin, 1981. 
 The Alder Tree. London: Allen & Unwin, 1981. 
 King Death's Garden. London: Orchard Books, 1986. 
 The Inland trilogy
 The Daymaker. London: Orchard Books, 1987. 
 Transformations. London: Orchard Books, 1988. 
 The Skybreaker. London: Orchard Books, 1990. 
 Dinosaur Junction. London: Orchard Books, 1992. 
 The Haunting of Jessica Raven. London: Orion, 1994. 
 The Fear Man. London: Orion, 1995. 
 The Powerhouse. London: Orion, 1997. 
 Crying in the Dark. London: Dolphin, 1998 (paper). 
 The N.I.M.R.O.D. Conspiracy. London: Dolphin, 1999 (paper). 
 Don't Open Your Eyes. London: Dolphin, 1999 (paper). 
 The Shadow on the Stairs. Edinburgh: Barrington Stoke, 2000 (paper). 
 Dr. Franklin's Island. London: Orion/Dolphin, 2001. 
 Taylor Five. London: Dolphin, 2002 (paper). 
 Finders Keepers. Edinburgh: Barrington Stoke, 2004 (paper). 
 Siberia. London: Orion, 2005.  (shortlist, Booktrust Teenage Prize)
 Snakehead. London: Orion, 2007.

References

External links 
Gwyneth's personal blog since 2009

1997 interview at Spike Magazine
Interview Independent Online 

English fantasy writers
English science fiction writers
English children's writers
Science fiction critics
British speculative fiction critics
British speculative fiction editors
Writers from Manchester
Alumni of the University of Sussex
Women science fiction and fantasy writers
World Fantasy Award-winning writers
1952 births
Living people
British women short story writers
English women novelists
English women non-fiction writers